Denis Sandona (born 5 October 1955) is a French biathlete. He competed in the 20 km individual event at the 1980 Winter Olympics.

References

1955 births
Living people
French male biathletes
Olympic biathletes of France
Biathletes at the 1980 Winter Olympics
Place of birth missing (living people)